Jeffery Gibson (born 15 August 1990) is a Bahamian sprint athlete from Grand Bahama who mainly competes in the 400 metres and 400 metres hurdles. He is the Bahamian national record holder in the latter event with a 49.39 seconds clocking during the semi-finals of the 2013 NCAA Championships. He attended Bishop Michael Eldon School formerly Freeport Anglican High School. He later competed for Oral Roberts University following in the foot steps of compatriot Andretti Bain.

Personal bests

Competition record

References

External links

 Oral Roberts Profile 
 TFRRS Profile

1990 births
Living people
Bahamian male hurdlers
Bahamian male sprinters
People from Freeport, Bahamas
Oral Roberts Golden Eagles athletes
Oral Roberts University alumni
Athletes (track and field) at the 2014 Commonwealth Games
Athletes (track and field) at the 2018 Commonwealth Games
Athletes (track and field) at the 2015 Pan American Games
Athletes (track and field) at the 2019 Pan American Games
Pan American Games gold medalists for the Bahamas
Pan American Games medalists in athletics (track and field)
World Athletics Championships athletes for the Bahamas
World Athletics Championships medalists
Athletes (track and field) at the 2016 Summer Olympics
Olympic athletes of the Bahamas
Commonwealth Games medallists in athletics
Commonwealth Games bronze medallists for the Bahamas
Medalists at the 2015 Pan American Games
Medallists at the 2014 Commonwealth Games